Thomas James Fitzpatrick (14 February 1918 – 2 October 2006) was an Irish Fine Gael politician who served as Ceann Comhairle of Dáil Éireann from 1982 to 1987, Minister for Fisheries and Forestry from 1981 to 1982, Minister for Transport and Power from 1976 to 1977 and Minister for Lands from 1973 to 1976. He served as a Teachta Dála (TD) from 1965 to 1989. He was a Senator for the Labour Panel from 1961 to 1965.

Early life
Fitzpatrick was born at Scotshouse, Clones, County Monaghan in 1918. He was educated at St. Macartan's College, the Incorporated Law Society and University College Dublin where he qualified as a solicitor, and then entered practice as a solicitor in Cavan town.

Politics
Fitzpatrick first held political office in 1950, when he was elected to Cavan Urban District Council. In 1961, he moved to national politics when he was elected to Seanad Éireann. He was first elected to Dáil Éireann as a Fine Gael Teachta Dála (TD) for the Cavan constituency at the 1965 general election. He held many Opposition Front Bench portfolios including Defence, Health and Social Welfare, Justice and the Environment, as well as being Fine Gael Chief Whip from 1979 to 1981.

Fitzpatrick served in the Irish Government on several occasions under Liam Cosgrave and Garret FitzGerald. His first government post was in 1973, when he was appointed Minister for Lands. After Fine Gael lost power in 1977, he was mentioned as a possible leader of the party if a compromise were needed between FitzGerald and Cosgrave. Following the November 1982 general election, he was elected as Ceann Comhairle, a post which he held until 1987. Fitzpatrick was re-elected to the Dáil (or automatically returned as Ceann Comhairle) at every election until 1989 when he retired from politics.

References

1918 births
2006 deaths
Alumni of University College Dublin
Fine Gael TDs
Local councillors in County Cavan
Members of the 10th Seanad
Members of the 18th Dáil
Members of the 19th Dáil
Members of the 20th Dáil
Members of the 21st Dáil
Members of the 22nd Dáil
Members of the 23rd Dáil
Members of the 24th Dáil
Members of the 25th Dáil
People from Clones, County Monaghan
Politicians from County Monaghan
Presiding officers of Dáil Éireann
Ministers for Transport (Ireland)
Fine Gael senators